José Monteiro (23 October 1913 – unknown), commonly known as Costuras, was a professional football player.

During his career he played in F.C. Porto, and in the season of 1938–39 he was the top scorer of the championship, with 18 goals.

He is referenced as a Legendary player of F.C. Porto in FIFA.com's classic football section.

References

External links
 Costuras at Estrelas do FCP
 

1913 births
Portuguese footballers
FC Porto players
Primeira Liga players
Year of death missing

Association football forwards